Liberty or death, Independence or death or similar phrases may refer to:

Patriotic slogans 
Eleftheria i thanatos ('Freedom or Death'), national motto of Greece
 "Give me liberty, or give me death!", attributed to American Founding Father Patrick Henry in 1775
  The Culpeper Minutemen had "Liberty or death" on their flag
Independência ou morte ('Independence or Death'), motto of the Empire of Brazil (1822–1889)
Libertad o Muerte ('Freedom or Death), national motto of Uruguay
Sloboda ili smrt ('Freedom or Death'), motto of the Serbian/Yugoslav Chetniks
Viața-n libertate ori moarte! ('Life in freedom or death!'), a shout proclaimed in the national anthem of Romania
 Svoboda ili smart ('Freedom or Death'), a slogan used by the early Bulgarian revolutionaries. The same slogan was used by various regional Bulgarian komitadjis later.
 Ya istiklâl ya ölüm ('Either independence or death'), a national motto of Turkey
Merdeka atau Mati! ('Independence or Death!'), a slogan / quote by Bung Tomo during the Indonesian National Revolution.
Marşo ya joƶalla ('Freedom or Death'), motto of the Sheikh Mansur Battalion
Volia abo smert ('Freedom or Death'), motto of Ukraine
Azatut'yun kam mah ('Freedom or Death'), motto of the Armenian Revolutionary Federation

Other uses 
GNU General Public License#Version 2, nicknamed "Liberty or Death"
Liberty or Death (album), by Grave Digger, 2007
Liberty or Death (video game), 1993 
Freedom or Death, a 1913 speech made by English militant feminist Emmeline Pankhurst
 Independence or Death (painting), by Pedro Américo, 1888
 Troutman flag, with the words "Liberty or Death", used by the Georgia battalion during Texas revolution
 "" ('Death or Liberty'), a quotation from the play The Robbers by Friedrich Schiller

See also
 Give Me Liberty (disambiguation)
 Socialism or Barbarism (disambiguation)
 List of national mottos
 Captain Michalis, or Freedom or Death, a 1953 novel by Nikos Kazantzakis
 Liberté, égalité, fraternité, the national motto of France and the Republic of Haiti 
 Live Free or Die, the state motto of New Hampshire, U.S.
 Join, or Die
 Samuel Sharpe, an enslaved Jamaican, who said "I would rather die among yonder gallows, than live in slavery."

Political catchphrases